The first 100 days of Joe Biden's presidency began on January 20, 2021, the day Joe Biden was inaugurated as the 46th president of the United States. The first 100 days of a presidential term took on symbolic significance during Franklin D. Roosevelt's first term in office, and the period is considered a benchmark to measure the early success of a president. The 100th day of his presidency ended at noon on April 30, 2021.

Over his first 100 days, Biden signed 42 executive orders, more than any of his predecessors since Harry Truman. Many of these executive orders were reversals to Donald Trump's policies. On March 11, he signed the American Rescue Plan, a $1.9 trillion bill to help relieve economic strain due to the COVID-19 pandemic.

With the elections of Jon Ossoff and Raphael Warnock in Georgia, Democrats held a slim majority in both the House and the Senate. This was crucial in ensuring the passage of the American Rescue Plan, as every Republican senator voted against it.

Pledges 
Biden pledged to do the following in his first 100 days:

 Provide 100 million doses of the COVID-19 vaccine; this goal was later doubled to 200 million doses
 Raise the refugee cap set by Donald Trump from 15,000 to 125,000
 Revoke the permit for the Keystone XL Pipeline 
 Stop construction on the southern border wall
 End travel restrictions to Muslim countries
 Rejoin the Paris Climate Agreement and the World Health Organization
 End United States involvement in the War in Afghanistan and the Yemeni Civil War

Inauguration 

The first 100 days of the Presidency of Joe Biden began during the inauguration of Joe Biden with the conversion of Whitehouse.gov from the Trump Administration version to the Biden Administration version at 12:00 pm on January 20, 2021. This was the fourth presidential online portal transition and the second to involve social media accounts such as Twitter.

Attempts to overturn the 2020 United States presidential election 

Following Joe Biden's victory in the 2020 United States presidential election, then-President Donald Trump, along with his campaign and political allies, pursued an effort to dispute the election. These efforts culminated in the January 6 United States Capitol attack, in which thousands of President Trump's supporters stormed the Capitol while the electoral votes were being counted, despite President Trump's admonitions to be peaceful.  Of the hundreds of people who stormed the Capitol, the Department of Justice under the Biden Administration found none of them guilty of sedition.

Trump and his allies encouraged election officials to throw out legitimate votes, especially in states where Biden won with a narrow lead. In a phone call in early January, Trump pressed Georgia's Secretary of State, Brad Raffensperger, to "find" 11,780 votes, the number of votes by which he lost in the state. President Trump refused to concede until January 7, 2021, when he publicly acknowledged that he would not serve a second term.

Administration and Cabinet 

On January 18, 2021, Biden announced his 23-member cabinet. These included Secretary of State Antony Blinken, Attorney General Merrick Garland, Treasury Janet L. Yellen, Defense Lloyd Austin, the Interior Deb Haaland, Agriculture Tom Vilsack, Envoy for Climate John Kerry, Commerce Gina Raimondo, Labor Martin J. Walsh, Health Xavier Becerra, Security Advisor Jake Sullivan, UN Ambassador Linda Thomas-Greenfield, Trade Representative Katherine Tai, Domestic Policy Susan Rice, Veterans Affairs Denis McDonough, Intelligence Avril D. Haines, Homeland Security Alejandro N. Mayorkas, Housing Marcia L. Fudge, Energy Jennifer M. Granholm, Transportation Pete Buttigieg, Climate Gina McCarthy, EPA Administrator Michael S. Regan, and Education Miguel A. Cardona.

Domestic policy

American Rescue Plan 

The American Rescue Plan is a $1.9 trillion economic stimulus package, which passed the 117th United States Congress on March 10, 2021, and signed into law by President Biden the next day. Building on the CARES Act, it created a number of measures to relieve the economy due to the COVID-19 pandemic, including the following:

 Sending $1,400 direct payments to citizens making under $75,000 a year, with the benefits phasing out for high-income taxpayers
 Paid leave benefits for 100 million workers by offering a tax credit for employers who offer paid leave
 Extending the child tax credit for 2021 from $2,000 per child to $3,000 per child
 Grants to small businesses, including over $28 billion for restaurants through the Restaurant Revitalization Fund

The Act passed on a near party-line vote, with 50 Senate Democrats voting for the bill and 49 Republicans voting against. An amended version passed the House with 220 votes for it and 211 votes against, with one Democrat joining every Republican in voting against it.

COVID-19 vaccine distribution 

A major goal of President Biden was to distribute 100 million doses of the COVID-19 vaccine by the end of his first 100 days. By the time Biden took office, Operation Warp Speed was already distributing a million doses a day on average. This goal was reached by the 59th day of his presidency, and he soon after doubled the goal to 200 million doses. This goal was met on April 21, 2021, with a week to spare until his 100th day in office.

Immigration policy 

Biden campaigned on the promise he would roll back President Trump's hard-line stance on immigration. Shortly after taking office, he ended construction on the southern border wall. Biden had pledged to raise the Trump-era immigration cap from 15,000 people a year to 125,000, but backtracked on this promise shortly after becoming President, citing humanitarian concerns. His administration worked to protect hundreds of thousands of immigrants, mainly from Venezuela and Myanmar, from deportation. Lack of significant action has drawn criticism, especially since Biden has failed to deliver on many of his immigration-related promises.

Foreign policy

Rejoining international organizations 

On June 1, 2017, President Trump announced that the United States would cease participation in the 2015 Paris Agreement on climate change mitigation. The withdrawal took place on November 4, 2020, one day after the 2020 election. Following the election, President-Elect Biden pledged to rejoin the agreement, which he did on his first day in office. The United States formally rejoined the agreement on February 19, 2021.

President Trump also announced plans to withdraw the United States from the World Health Organization effective as of July 6, 2021, accusing the WHO of being under China's control. In a letter to UN Secretary-General Antonio Guteres on January 20, 2021, President Biden stated that the United States would resume funding the WHO.

China–US relations 

The Biden administration has made competing with China a top priority. The United States has sanctioned Chinese officials over human rights abuses and kept in place the tariffs introduced during the Trump administration. Biden has emphasized the importance of rebuilding ties with allies to counter Chinese growth.

Defense 
By the time Biden took office, the US military budget was at an all-time high—the Trump administration had requested a budget of over $740 billion for FY 2020. Biden has promised to repair relationships with allies, and stated that the United States was "fully committed" to the NATO alliance. During his address to the Munich Security Conference, he said that the United States would "earn back [its] position of trusted leadership."

Speech to a joint session of Congress 

The 46th President of the United States, Joe Biden, gave his first public address before a joint session of the United States Congress on April 28, 2021, the eve of his 100th day in office.

See also 
 First 100 days of Franklin D. Roosevelt's presidency
 First 100 days of Barack Obama's presidency
 First 100 days of Donald Trump's presidency
 Presidential transition of Joe Biden
 Opinion polling on the Joe Biden administration

References

External links 

2021 in American politics
January 2021 events in the United States
February 2021 events in the United States
March 2021 events in the United States
April 2021 events in the United States
Presidency of Joe Biden
Biden, Joe